This is a list of notable people from Queens County, New Brunswick. Although not everyone in this list was born in Queens County, they all live or have lived in Queens County and have had significant connections to the communities.

Queens